Eupachydisus isculensis  is a Pachydiscid ammonite species from the Upper Cretaceous marine strata of France, Spain and Italy.

References
Treatise on Invertebrate Paleontology, Part L, Mollusca 4, R.C. Moore, ed. Geological Soc. of America and Univ. Kansas Press. p L377-L380. 
  Paleobiology Database

Desmoceratoidea